Herman Russell Branson (August 14, 1914 – June 7, 1995) was an American physicist, chemist, best known for his research on the alpha helix protein structure, and was also the president of two colleges. He received a fellowship from the Rosenwald Foundation.

Early life 

Branson  received his B.S. from Virginia State College in 1936, and his Ph.D. in physics from the University of Cincinnati, under the direction of Boris Podolsky, in 1939. His thesis was in three parts, the first involved the interaction of x-rays with Tubifex tubifex (or sludge worm), the second involving the design and construction of an X-ray intensity measuring device, and the third section on the quantization of mass using the Dirac Equation.  After a stint at Dillard University, he joined Howard University in 1941 as an assistant professor of physics and chemistry. As a scientist, Branson made significant contributions to how proteins work, and how they contribute to diseases such as sickle cell anemia.  He remained at Howard for 27 years, achieving increasingly important positions, eventually becoming head of the physics department, director of a program in experimental science and mathematics, and working on the Office of Naval Research and Atomic Energy Commission Projects in Physics at Howard University. One of his students would include Marie Maynard Daly who was the first woman of color in the United States to earn her doctorate in Chemistry.

Work on protein structure 

In 1948, Branson took a leave and spent time at the California Institute of Technology, in the laboratory of the chemist Linus Pauling. There he was assigned work on the structure of proteins, specifically to use his mathematical abilities to determine possible helical structures that would fit both the available X-ray  crystallography data and a set of chemical restrictions outlined by Pauling. After some months of work, Branson handed in a report narrowing the possible structures to two helices: a tighter coil Pauling termed "alpha," and a looser helix called "gamma." Branson then returned to Howard to work on other projects. Some months later he received a letter from Pauling along with a draft manuscript of a paper detailing the two helixes, with Branson listed as third author (after Pauling and his assistant Robert Corey, the laboratory's expert in transforming X-ray data into precise models). Pauling asked for suggestions.  Branson replied in a letter that it was fine as written, approved submission to the Proceedings of the National Acaademy of Sciences, and asked for 25 preprints when published.

Later career and controversy 
Branson went on to a significant career, eventually serving as president of Central State University in Wilberforce, Ohio, from 1968–1970, and then president of Lincoln University until his retirement in 1985. He was active in increasing federal funding for higher education, and helped found the National Association for Equal Opportunity in Higher Education in 1990
.

In 1984 Branson wrote Pauling biographers Victor and Mildred Goertzel implying that his contribution to the alpha helix had been greater than the final paper indicated. "I took my work to Pauling who told me that he thought they [the proposed alpha and gamma helixes] were too tight, that he thought that a protein molecule should have a much larger radius so that water molecules could fit down inside and cause the protein to swell," he wrote. "I went back and worked unsuccessfully to find such a structure."  When he received Pauling's note with the draft manuscript, Branson wrote, "I interpreted this letter as establishing that the alpha and gamma in my paper were correct and that the subsequent work done was cleaning up or verifying. The differences were nil." He added in his letter to the Goertzels that he "resented" the later attention lavished on Pauling and Corey. The conservative watchdog group Accuracy in Media referred to the incident in an attack on Pauling in 1994. The available records, historical context, knowledge of the personalities involved, and studies of Pauling's laboratory and methods at the time have led most historians to accord greater credit to Pauling and Corey.

References 
16.Herman Russell Branson - was born on 14 August in 1914 in Pocahontas Virginia.He was an american chemist also physicist. He was the president of two colleges and he took a scholarship from the Rosenwald Foundation.Branson got his Bachelor's degree in 1936.Branson as a scientist contributed significantly to the way that proteins work as well as their ability to cure diseases, for instance, sickle cell anemia.Prior to taking on a higher position as a head of the physics department, director of a program in experimental science and mathematics, as well as working at Howard University in the department of Naval Research and Atomic Energy Commission Projects in Physics, he stayed at this university for 27 years and attained significant achievements. Dr. Herman Branson died on June 7,1995. 

1914 births
1995 deaths
20th-century American physicists
Virginia State University alumni
University of Cincinnati alumni
Dillard University faculty
Howard University faculty
Scientists from Virginia
20th-century African-American scientists
African-American physicists
Presidents of Lincoln University (Pennsylvania)